Atlee or Attlee is a surname and masculine given name.

People

Surname
Beverly Atlee Bunn (1916–2021), birthname of American author Beverly Cleary
Clement Attlee (1883–1967), Prime Minister of the United Kingdom 
John Atlee (athlete) (1882–1958), American athlete
John Attlee, 3rd Earl Attlee (born 1956), member of the House of Lords and grandson of Clement Attlee
John Light Atlee (1799–1885), American physician
Martin Attlee, 2nd Earl Attlee (1927–1991), British politician and son of Clement Attlee
Samuel John Atlee (1739–1786), American soldier and statesman
Washington Atlee Burpee (1858—1915), founder of Burpee Seeds
William Atlee, mayor of Lancaster, Pennsylvania from 1869 to 1871
William Augustus Atlee (1735–1793), Judge of the Pennsylvania Supreme Court and University of Pennsylvania Trustee 
Violet Attlee, Countess Attlee (1895–1964), wife of Clement Attlee

Given name
Atlee, an Indian film director
Atlee Alan Cockrell (born 1962), Major League Baseball outfielder
Atlee Ayres (1873–1969), architect from Texas
Atlee Hammaker (born 1958), Major League Baseball pitcher
Atlee Mahorn (born 1965), Canadian Olympic sprinter
Atlee Pomerene (1863–1937), Democratic senator from Ohio
David Atlee Phillips (1922–1988), Central Intelligence Agency officer 
Edwin Atlee Barber (1851–1916), American archeologist and author
George Atlee Goodling, (1896–1982), Republican U.S. Representative from Pennsylvania
Jacob Atlee Beidler (1852–1912), Republican U.S. Representative from Ohio
Paul Atlee Walker, (1881–1965), Chairman of the Federal Communications Commission
Walter Atlee Edwards (1886–1928), Lieutenant-Commander in the United States Navy

Fictional characters
 Atlee, a DC Comics character
 Atlee, a supporting character in the 2015 spy film Mission: Impossible – Rogue Nation played by Simon McBurney

Masculine given names
English-language surnames